The GER Class S44 was a class of forty 0-4-4T steam locomotives designed by James Holden for the Great Eastern Railway. They all passed to the London and North Eastern Railway at the 1923 grouping and received the classification G4.

History
These were the last 0-4-4T locomotives built for the Great Eastern Railway, a type which, as side tanks, the GER had pioneered in Britain. The locomotives were all built at Stratford Works and had  inside cylinders driving  wheels.

All were still in service at the 1923 grouping; the LNER adding 7000 to the numbers of nearly all the ex-Great Eastern locomotives, including the Class S44 locomotives. Withdrawals started in 1929 with No. 8133 and finished in 1939 with 8139.

References

External links
 – Great Eastern Railway Society
The Holden G4 (GER Class S44) 0-4-4T Locomotives – LNER Encyclopedia

S44
0-4-4T locomotives
Railway locomotives introduced in 1898
Scrapped locomotives
Standard gauge steam locomotives of Great Britain
Passenger locomotives